Totally Insane is the self-titled fourth album released by rap duo, Totally Insane. It was released on September 22, 1998 for Felonious Records and was produced by Totally Insane (Mac-10, Ad Kapone), Premiere Music Group (TC, Race & Reggie Smith), Scoot Dogg, The Enhancer, Nick Peace and Drawz. This was the group's first album to not make it on any Billboard charts.

Track listing
"Cituations"- 3:40
"So Real"- 4:06
"Falsified"- 3:54
"Hog Status"- 3:46
"Another Way"- 3:30
"Lengendary"- 4:15
"Bay Love"- 3:45
"Git Them G's"- 3:29
"The Newz"- 4:28
"M & M Hoodz"- 4:37
"Feel Me"- 3:18
"Rapid Fire"- 3:28
"Ebonix"- 3:33
"It Ain't Like That"- 4:31
"Addicted to Me"- 3:19
"Fully Auto"- 4:35

1998 albums
Totally Insane albums